Ibrahim Okyay (born 1 August 1969) is a Turkish auto racing driver. He is best known for competing in the FIA World Touring Car Championship.

Racing career

Okyay first entered the WTCC in 2006. He competed in just two races at his home circuit of Istanbul Park, driving an independent BMW 320i ran by Kosifler Motorsport. After winning the 2007 Turkish Touring Car Championship, he returned to the WTCC in 2008 for a full season this time driving a BMW 320si for Borusan Otomotiv Motorsport, finishing sixth in the Independents Trophy. He returned in 2011 for a limited season with the Borusan Otomotiv Motorsport team.

He competed in the European Touring Car Cup with Borusan Otomotiv Motorsport in a BMW 320si in 2011.

He currently competes in the GT4 European Series for Borusan Otomotiv.

Racing record

Complete World Touring Car Championship results
(key) (Races in bold indicate pole position) (Races in italics indicate fastest lap)

References

External links
 

1969 births
Living people
Turkish racing drivers
World Touring Car Championship drivers
European Touring Car Cup drivers
GT4 European Series drivers